Nicetosoma is a genus of moths in the subfamily Arctiinae from eastern Sundaland, from Sulawesi to New Guinea.

Species
 Nicetosoma eogena (Walker, [1865])
 Nycetosoma hyporhoda (Butler, 1882)
 Nicetosoma inexpectata (Rothschild, 1933)
 Nicetosoma meforensis de Vos, 2011
 Nicetosoma niceta (Stoll, 1782)
 Nicetosoma papuana (Rothschild, 1910)
 Nicetosoma saturata (Rothschild, 1910)
 Nicetosoma sulphurata de Vos, 2011
 Nicetosoma semirosea (Butler, 1887)1

References
 , 2011: Nicetosoma gen.nov., a new genus for the "Spilosoma" niceta group of species East of the Weber Line (Lepidoptera: Erebidae, Arctiinae, Arctiini). Suara Serangga Papua 5 (4): 109-144.

Spilosomina
Moths of Asia
Moth genera